Networker Baire is a Bangladeshi romantic comedy web film written and directed by Mizanur Rahman Aryan. The story is inspired by true events. Screenplay has been done by Jobaed Ahsan along with Mizanur Rahman Aryan. The film stars Sariful Razz, Yash Rohan, Nazia Haque Orsha, Tasnuva Tisha, Khairul Basar, Junayed Bukdadi, Tasnia Farin, Nazifa Tushi.

Networker Baire is the first film of the famous television direction Mizanur Rahman Aryan. Initially, he wanted to make it for theatres. But due to this ongoing COVID-19 pandemic, releasing films in theatres has become difficult. In this circumstance, Chorki came forward and financed this project.

Redoan Rony serves as the producer of the film under the banner on Frame Per Second in association with Mr. Aryan Films. Networker Baire has been released on Chorki on 19 August 2021.

Networker Baire received critical acclaim, with praise for its story, cinematography, acting, and music.

Plot 
Four Friends; Munna, Abir, Sifat, and Ratul. This is the story of their bond, friendship, and the ups and down of life. They plan a tour to get out of this chaotic city, have a blast, explore, and go beyond the network. This is the first tour of them together, they plan to continue this tradition forever, but an unexpected event happens that changes their life. Those four friends were engaging in fun, banters, and madness in the heart of Cox's Bazar when something unexpected happens to them.

Cast

Production 
On 8 April 2021, Chorki released a mashup video revealing their launching date and their upcoming most awaited projects. In that video, there were some scenes of Networker Baire but that time name wasn't announced.

On 30 April 2021, they finally announced the film Networker Baire and introduced the cast and crew of the film in a press release.

Filming began in November 2020 in Dhaka. Indoor shooting completed here. And the principal outdoor photography has been taken place on beaches of Cox's Bazar and St. Martin's Island in December 2020 to January 2021 for a span of 17 days. There were some underwater shoots in the sea which required expertise.

Release 
The film has been released digitally on Chorki on 19 August 2021.

Reception 
Networker Baire has been praised by both critics and the audience. Suborna Mustafa wrote, "Mizanur Rahman Aryan's storytelling style is totally different. Networker Baire is just another signature of his talent". Reviewing for The Business Standard, Siffat Bin Ayub gave the film a "7.2 out of 10" score and said, "The film delivered on exactly what we wanted – some beautiful scenery, good acting, and a simple yet wonderful story about friendship."

Music 
The first song of the film was released on Chorki's YouTube channel on Friendship Day 2021.

References

External links
 Networker Baire on Chorki
 

2021 films
Chorki original films
Bengali-language Bangladeshi films
2020s Bengali-language films
Films shot in Cox's Bazar
Films set in Cox's Bazar